Vahidin Čahtarević (born 24 August 1976) is a Bosnian retired football player.

Club career
In 2012, Čahtarević claimed to have played in over 30 'fixed' matches during his career among others playing in a game against fellow strugglers Orašje which got his club Jedinstvo Bihać relegated after some alleged dubious refereeing.

International career
Čahtarević made two appearances for Bosnia and Herzegovina in two March 2000 friendly matches away against Jordan.

Post-playing career
He worked as an assistant to Kemal Alispahić at Al-Qaisumah in Saudi Arabia and started working for the youth section at Jedinstvo in 2019.

References

External links

Profile - NFSBIH

1976 births
Living people
People from Zavidovići
Association football midfielders
Bosnia and Herzegovina footballers
Bosnia and Herzegovina international footballers
NK Čelik Zenica players
NK Jedinstvo Bihać players
FK Sarajevo players
NK HAŠK players
NK Croatia Sesvete players
FK Krajina Cazin players
Premier League of Bosnia and Herzegovina players
First Football League (Croatia) players
Bosnia and Herzegovina expatriate footballers
Expatriate footballers in Croatia
Bosnia and Herzegovina expatriate sportspeople in Croatia
Bosnia and Herzegovina expatriate sportspeople in Saudi Arabia